Turkey participated at the 2010 Winter Olympics in Vancouver, British Columbia, Canada.

Competitors

Alpine skiing

Men

Women

Cross-country skiing

Men

Women

Figure skating

Women

External links
Vancouver 2010 Turkey

2010 in Turkish sport
Nations at the 2010 Winter Olympics
2010